The 10 kilometre cross-country skiing event was the first event cross-country skiing programme to take place at the 1984 Winter Olympics, in Sarajevo, Yugoslavia. It was the ninth appearance of the 10 km race. The competition was held on Thursday, February 9, 1984 at Veliko Polje, Igman and was the first final to be held at the games.

Marja-Liisa Hämäläinen of Finland took Gold and was the second Finn to win this event after Lydia Wideman in 1952. The 1976 gold medal winner, Raisa Smetanina, won silver. All 52 athletes who entered the race finished with an official time.

Results

References

External links
Official Olympic Report

Women's cross-country skiing at the 1984 Winter Olympics
Women's 10 kilometre cross-country skiing at the Winter Olympics
Oly
Cross